William Herman Vobach (December 25, 1929 – May 31, 2020) was an American politician from the state of Indiana. A Republican, he served in the Indiana State Senate from 1983 to 1990. He was a lawyer.

References

1929 births
2020 deaths
Lawyers from Chicago
Politicians from Chicago
Politicians from Indianapolis
Republican Party Indiana state senators
Indiana lawyers
Oberlin College alumni
University of Michigan Law School alumni